Asphodeloideae is a subfamily of the monocot family Asphodelaceae in the order Asparagales. It has previously been treated as a separate family, Asphodelaceae sensu stricto. The family Asphodelaceae has now been proposed to be a nomen conservandum, and the proposal has been recommended for ratification in 2017. In that case, Asphodelaceae will have priority over Xanthorrhoeaceae. This is reflected in the APG IV family lists.

The subfamily name is derived from the generic name of the type genus, Asphodelus. Members of group are native to Africa, central and western Europe, the Mediterranean basin, Central Asia and Australia, with one genus (Bulbinella) having some of its species in New Zealand. The greatest diversity occurs in South Africa.

The genera Aloe, Asphodelus, and Kniphofia are perhaps best known from their use in horticulture as ornamental plants.

Description 

The Asphodeloideae are distinguished by a general presence of anthraquinones, simultaneous microsporogenesis, atypical ovules morphology, and the presence of an aril.  Asphodeloideae also have a characteristic secondary growth by means of a secondary thickening meristem. This character, however, is also found in other taxa in the Asparagales, including Agavaceae, Iridaceae, and Xanthorrhoeoideae. It is confined to Asparagales among the monocots and is believed to have evolved independently in most families.

Aloin cells 

The presence of aloin cells is a distinctive character of the Aloeae. These cells are present in all Aloeae, but are absent in most of the other genera within Asphodeloideae. A well-developed cap of thin-walled parenchyma cells occurs at the phloem pole of each vascular bundle. Chase posits that they are involved in secondary metabolite production, but Beaumont suggests that the cells act as a storage tissue for compounds synthesized in the surrounding layer of cells. The aloin cells are said to produce the characteristic thick exudate that is produced when the succulent leaf of aloe is severed. The aloin cells produce anthraquinone and chromone derivatives, which may be responsible for the medicinal attributes of Aloe.

Taxonomy 

Lotsy (1911) placed a number of genera (Kniphofia, Notosceptrum, Chortolirion and Aloe) into a family, separate from Asphodelaceae, the Aloinaceae. Other taxonomists have subsequently circumscribed a tribe, Aloineae (or Aloeae) to include Gasteria, Haworthia and Aloe. Other taxonomic terms have included Aloaceae, Alooideae, Aloideae, Aloidea, Aloides, Aloinae and Aloeace, with the type genus Aloe.

Phylogeny of Asphodeloideae 

There is agreement among many researchers that Asphodeloideae can be further divided into a monophyletic group comprising Aloe and its immediate relatives, and a nonmonophyletic group of the remaining genera. The monophyletic group can be treated as the tribe Aloeae within the subfamily Asphodeloideae by those adopting the broad APG IV system circumscription of the Asphodelaceae. (Alternatively, it may be treated as the subfamily Alooideae within a more narrowly circumscribed family Asphodelaceae.) Aloeae are mainly rosulated-leaf succulents, while the other genera are not succulent.  The genera in Aloeae are centered in southern Africa, while the other genera have mainly a Eurasian distribution.

Aloeae 

, Aloeae (or Alooideae s.s.) comprises Aloe, Aloiampelos, Aloidendron, Aristaloe, Astroloba, Gasteria, Gonialoe, Haworthia, Haworthiopsis, Kumara and Tulista. The genera within Alooideae have several morphological characters that can be distinguished in the field, namely the arrangement and type of leaf and inflorescence.

Evidence for monophyly of Aloeae is based on distinctive karyotype and characteristic leaf morphology.  The Bulbine group has characteristics of Aloeae, but is not included in the group due to a lack of tubular flowers.  Kniphofia is considered an outgroup of Aloeae since it has tubular flowers and a fusion of perianth segments, but it lacks succulent leaves.

Selected list of genera 

The genera listed below are those accepted by APWeb . Other treatments combine some of these genera into as few as seven.

 Aloe L.
 Aloiampelos Klopper & Gideon F.Sm.
 Aloidendron (A.Berger) Klopper & Gideon F.Sm.
 Aristaloe Boatwr. & Manning
 Astroloba Uitewaal
 Asphodeline Rchb.
 Asphodelus L.
 Bulbine Wolf
 Bulbinella Kunth
 Chortolirion A.Berger
 Eremurus M.Bieb.
 Gasteria Duval
 Gonialoe (Baker) Boatwr. & J.C.Manning
 Haworthia Duval
 Haworthiopsis G.D.Rowley
 Jodrellia Baijnath
 Kniphofia Moench
 Kumara Medik
 Trachyandra Kunth
 Tulista Raf.

For a phylogeny of the family, see the phylogenetic tree at Asphodelaceae.

References

Bibliography 

 
 
 
 Asphodeloideae At: Angiosperm Phylogeny Website At: Missouri Botanical Garden Website
 Asphodelaceae in L. Watson and M.J. Dallwitz (1992 onwards). The families of flowering plants: descriptions, illustrations, identification, information retrieval. Version: 9 March 2006. https://web.archive.org/web/20070103200438/http://delta-intkey.com/
 NCBI Taxonomy Browser
 links at CSDL, Texas

External links

 
Asparagales subfamilies